Rémy Martin (born 10 August 1979 in Aubenas, Ardèche) is a French rugby union footballer. He has also played for France. His usual position is at flanker.

Martin's first club was Mont de Marsan. He played six games for the club in the European Challenge Cup during the 2000–01 season, including scoring a try in the first two matches against Bristol and Parma. The following season he signed with Stade Français. He played in five matches for the Stade Français in the 2001–02 Heineken Cup, starting one game against Munster.

Martin made his international debut for France in 2002, in a match against England during the 2002 Six Nations Championship on 6 March. Martin played in two other tests for France during the tournament, against Scotland and Ireland. In 2003, he played four matches for Stade Français during the 2002–03 Heineken Cup, scoring a try in a pool match against Rovigo. Stade Français made it to the final of the domestic championship of France, where they met Toulouse. Stade Français defeated Toulouse 32 points to 18 at Stade de France in Saint-Denis.

The following season Stade Français again made it to the final of the French championship, where they were to face USA Perpignan. Stade Français defeated Perpignan 38 points to 20 in the final, making it back-to-back championships. Stade Français made it to the final of the 2004–05 Heineken Cup, where they were to face Toulouse, who they defeated in the French championship in 2003. However, Toulouse won, 18 points to 12. Stade Français also made it to the French championship that season, but were defeated by Biarritz Olympique 37 points to 34.

In 2005, he was called up to the French squad for tests against the Springboks and Australia. He played in the first test against the Springboks on 18 June, and then had a starting position in the subsequent tests against South Africa again, and Australia. He earned another four caps that year, playing tests against Australia, Canada, Tonga and South Africa in November.

In 2006, Martin played two matches for France during the 2006 Six Nations Championship, against Scotland and Ireland. France went on to win the tournament. He was then selected in the French squad for tests against Romania and the Springboks in June.

He completed his move from Stade Français to Bayonne during summer 2008.

In 2010, he was selected in the French Barbarians squad to play Tonga on 26 November.

Honours
 Stade Français
Top 14: 2002–03, 2003–04, 2006–07

References

External links
Rémy Martin on lequipe.fr
Reéy Martin on IMDb.com
Rémy Martin on statistics.scrum.com

1979 births
Living people
People from Aubenas
French rugby union players
Rugby union flankers
Stade Français players
France international rugby union players
Sportspeople from Ardèche
Stade Montois players
Aviron Bayonnais players
Montpellier Hérault Rugby players
AS Béziers Hérault players